VLV may refer to

Christian Democratic Alliance (Fiji), political party whose Fijian name is Veitokani ni Lewenivanua Vakarisito
Voice of the Listener & Viewer, a British campaign group
"Viva la Vida", song by Coldplay
Viva la Vida or Death and All His Friends, album by Coldplay
Viva Las Vengeance, album by Panic! at the Disco
Peugeot VLV, 1940s electric microcar